Stanley Gouard (born October 14, 1970) is an American college basketball coach, currently head coach for the University of Southern Indiana (USI). Gouard also played for USI, where he was twice named NCAA Division II National Player of the Year.

College career
A native of Danville, Illinois, Gouard played for Danville High School, where he graduated in 1989. He tried unsuccessfully to catch on with two separate junior colleges before returning to Danville to work. After a strong showing in an amateur summer festival, he was signed by John A. Logan College and played the 1991–92 season, earning NJCAA All-American honors. While he was pursued by several Division I programs, his age limited his eligibility whereas the looser Division II standards would allow him to compete for three seasons. He opted to sign with coach Bruce Pearl at Southern Indiana and, after sitting out the 1992–93 season due to injury, began his USI career the next year.

Gouard led the Screaming Eagles to consecutive Division II championship games as a sophomore and junior, earning Tournament Most Outstanding Player honors in a close loss to Cal State Bakersfield in 1994. The next season Gouard led the team to its first national title as they defeated UC Riverside 71–63 in the final. Gouard was named NABC Division II Player of the Year in both his junior and senior seasons, as well as a first-team All-American.

Professional career
Following the close of his college career, Gouard played professionally in Sweden (Sundsvall Dragons), Colombia (Caimanes de Barranquilla) and Mexico (Dorados de Chihuahua). He also played in the United States for the Des Moines Dragons of the International Basketball Association. Gouard led the Caimanes to a Colombian championship during his time with them.

Coaching career
Gouard entered the coaching ranks in 2001 as he returned to USI as an assistant to head coach Rick Herdes' staff. Following the season, he moved to a similar position with the University of Indianapolis under coach Todd Sturgeon. He then moved to Division I Indiana State under Royce Waltman. He remained on staff for the 2007–08 season under Kevin McKenna after Waltman was fired.

He was named head coach at Indianapolis in 2008 after Waltman, who had served as interim head coach of the Greyhounds the previous year, decided not to pursue the job. Gouard coached the Greyhounds for twelve seasons, compiling a record of 204–111. He qualified for eight NCAA Division II Tournament appearances, reaching the tournament every year from 2010 to 2016 and again in 2020. He was named the Great Lakes Valley Conference (GLVC) Coach of the Year in 2014. During the 2019–20 season, Indianapolis finished 24–6 and earned the No. 1 seed in the NCAA Division II Midwest Regional before the season was cancelled due to the coronavirus pandemic.

On April 7, 2020, Gouard was named head coach of his alma mater, Southern Indiana, replacing the retiring Rodney Watson.

Head coaching record

References

External links
Indianapolis Greyhounds bio

1970 births
Living people
American expatriate basketball people in Colombia
American expatriate basketball people in Mexico
American expatriate basketball people in Sweden
American men's basketball coaches
American men's basketball players
Basketball coaches from Illinois
Basketball players from Illinois
College men's basketball head coaches in the United States
Indianapolis Greyhounds men's basketball coaches
Indiana State Sycamores men's basketball coaches
John A. Logan Volunteers men's basketball players
People from Danville, Illinois
Shooting guards
Small forwards
Southern Indiana Screaming Eagles men's basketball coaches
Southern Indiana Screaming Eagles men's basketball players
Sundsvall Dragons players